Shoal Lake is a locality in the southwest of Manitoba, Canada. Originally incorporated as a town, Shoal Lake amalgamated with the Rural Municipality of Shoal Lake on January 1, 2011 to form the Municipality of Shoal Lake, which became the Rural Municipality of Yellowhead on January 1, 2015.

History 
Shoal Lake was first settled in 1875 when the North-West Mounted Police established a barracks along the Carlton Trail at the south end of the lake. The community was established in 1884, and moved to its current location at the lake's north side in 1885 to coincide with the building of the Manitoba & Northwestern Railroad (now CPR). The community incorporated as a village on January 12, 1909, and then changed to town status on October 10, 1997. It amalgamated with the Rural Municipality of Shoal Lake on January 1, 2011, which combined further with the Rural Municipality of Strathclair on January 1, 2015 to form the Rural Municipality of Yellowhead.

Geography 
The community lies to the northeast of a lake of the same name. The lake appears on the Palliser map of 1865.

Climate

Demographics 

Attractions 
The community has a nine-hole golf course and hosts facilities for baseball, ice hockey, curling, and pickle-ball. It is home to the province's official museum to the North-West Mounted Police, which was built in 1984 to replicate barracks established at the south end of the lake in 1875.

Infrastructure 

Shoal Lake is located at the junction of highways 16, 21, and 42. It is serviced by the Shoal Lake Airport and Shoal Lake Water Aerodrome and by the Greyhound bus service (freight only).

Notable residents

Robert Beamish - Physician
Bob Brown - Wrestler
Glen Findlay - Politician
Greg Nesbitt - Politician
William J. Short - Politician

References

External links 
 Municipality of Shoal Lake

Designated places in Manitoba
Former towns in Manitoba
Localities in Manitoba
Populated places disestablished in 2011